Charlie Liam McCann (born 24 April 2002) is a professional footballer who plays as a midfielder for EFL League One club Forest Green Rovers. Born in England, he represents Northern Ireland at youth level.

Club career
Born in Coventry, McCann began his career with Coventry City before joining the Manchester United Academy at the age of 16. After four seasons with Manchester United, he joined Rangers on 30 July 2021, signing a three-year deal. The transfer fee paid by Rangers could reportedly rise to £750,000. McCann was initially part of Rangers' B team, competing in the Lowland Football League; however, he soon progressed to the senior squad. On 12 February 2022, he made his professional debut in a Scottish Cup match away to Annan Athletic as a 70th-minute substitute for Amad Diallo. A further substitute appearance in the Scottish Cup followed a month later on 13 March. McCann made his league debut for Rangers by replacing Borna Barišić as a 66th-minute substitute during a 2–0 win over Dundee United on 8 May 2022.

On 24 January 2023, McCann signed for League One bottom side Forest Green Rovers for an undisclosed fee on a long-term contract.

International career
Although he was born in England, McCann is eligible to play for both Irish national football teams. He was previously included in Republic of Ireland U17 and Republic of Ireland U19 squads. In March 2022, McCann switched allegiance to Northern Ireland and was selected for the Under-21 team.
On 27 May 2022, McCann was called up to the senior squad for their Nations League games in June 2022.

References

External links

2002 births
Living people
Footballers from Coventry
English footballers
Association football midfielders
Coventry City F.C. players
Manchester United F.C. players
Rangers F.C. players
Forest Green Rovers F.C. players
Scottish Professional Football League players
Lowland Football League players
Northern Ireland under-21 international footballers
Republic of Ireland youth international footballers
English people of Irish descent
English people of Northern Ireland descent